Witold Maliszewski (20 July 1873 – 18 July 1939) was a Polish composer, founder of Odessa Conservatory, and a professor of Warsaw Conservatory.

Biography 
Maliszewski was born in Mohyliv-Podilskyi, Russian Empire (now Ukraine). He graduated from Saint Petersburg Conservatory, in the class of Nikolai Rimsky-Korsakov. He was a member of Belyayev circle. In 1913 he became a founder and the first director of the Odessa Conservatory, which gave the world a number of outstanding musicians, such as David Oistrakh, Emil Gilels and Yakov Zak.

After the Russian revolution, because of the imminent threat of Bolshevik persecution, Maliszewski immigrated to Poland in 1921. In 1925–1927 he was teaching at the Chopin Music School and was the Director of the Warsaw Music Society. In 1927 he served as Chairman of the First International Frederic Chopin Piano Competition. From 1931 to 1934 Maliszewski was the Director of the Music Department at the Polish Ministry of Education. From 1931 to 1939 he was a professor at the Warsaw Conservatory. He died in Zalesie near Warsaw.

Maliszewski's symphonic works were largely shaped by Russian musical traditions. His symphonies belong to the non-programmatic (Glazunov's) type, and only the Fourth symphony in D Major op. 21 contain elements of Polish dances.

In the Soviet Union, Maliszewski's name was prohibited, and in 1950 the conservatory which he founded in Odessa was renamed after Antonina Nezhdanova, who had no links with the institution.

His students included Witold Lutosławski, Mykola Vilinsky, Shimon Shteynberg, Boleslaw Woytowicz, Feliks Roderyk Łabuński, Feliks Rybicki.

Selected works
Stage
 Syrena (The Mermaid), Opera-Ballet in 4 acts, Op. 24; libretto by Ludomir Michał Rogowski (1927)
 Boruta, Ballet (1929)

Orchestral
 Symphony No. 1 in G minor, Op. 8 (1902)
 Joyful Overture (Ouverture joyeuse; Fröhliche Ouverture) in D major, Op. 11  (1910)
 Symphony No. 2 in A major, Op. 12 (1912)
 Symphony No. 3 in C minor, Op. 14 (1907?)
 Symphony No. 4 in D major, Op. 21, Odrodzonej i odnalezionej ojczyźnie (To the newborn and recovered homeland) (1925)

Concertante
 Fantazja kujawska (Kuyavian Fantasy) for piano and orchestra (1928)
 Concerto in B minor for piano and orchestra, Op. 29 (1938)

Chamber music
 Sonata for violin and piano, Op. 1 (1900)
 String Quartet No. 1 in F major, Op. 2 (1902)
 Quintet in D minor for 2 violins, viola and 2 cellos, Op. 3 (1904)
 String Quartet No. 2 in C major, Op. 6 (1905)
 String Quartet No. 3 in E major, Op. 15 (1914)
 Quatre morceaux for violin & piano, Op. 20 (1923)

Piano
 Six Piano Pieces, Op. 4 (1904)
 Prélude et fugue fantastiques in B minor, Op. 16 (1913)

Choral
 Requiem (1930)
 Missa Pontificalis (1930)

Discographie

Archive recordings 
1952 : Fantazja kujawska (Wladyslaw Kedra, Polish Radio Orchestra of Bydgoszcz, cond. Arnold Rezler)
1959 : Piano Concerto (Jakub Kalecki, Jerzy Gert)
Piano Concerto (Andrzej Stefański, Polish Radio National SO)

Commercial recordings 
2014 : Works for Violin and Piano – Acte Préalable AP0285 
2014 : Chamber Music vol. 1 – Acte Préalable AP0327 
2015 : Complete Works for Piano – Acte Préalable AP0320 
2017 : Chamber Music vol. 2 – Acte Préalable AP0376

References 
 Wrocki E., W. Maliszewski, Warszawa, 1932.
 Valentyna Nazarenko, Ukrainian page of Maestro Maliszewski. "Day" Newspaper, No. 143, August 15, 2009 (translated from Ukrainian) 
 Nazarenko, V.I., Vilinsky, Yu. S., Volosatykh, O. Yu. Witold Maliszewski in the musical life of Ukraine 
and Poland. Chasopys of the Tchaikovsky National Academy of Music of Ukraine. - 2019. - № 2. P. 20-48.

Notes

External links 
 Witold Maliszewski 
 
 
 
 
 
 Scores by Witold Maliszewski in digital library Polona

20th-century classical composers
Polish classical composers
Pupils of Nikolai Rimsky-Korsakov
Russian classical composers
Russian male classical composers
Academic staff of the Chopin University of Music
1873 births
1939 deaths
Polish male classical composers
20th-century Polish musicians
People from Mohyliv-Podilskyi
20th-century Russian male musicians